Asuman Krause (born 1 March 1976) is a Turkish actress, singer, model and TV presenter of Circassian origin who was crowned Miss Turkey in 1998.

Early life and career
Born to a Circassian mother and a German father in Germany, Krause played for the Germany national youth basketball team. Afterwards she decided to stay with her mother in Turkey. She then became a model and in March 1998 she won the Miss Turkey beauty pageant and went on to represent Turkey at Miss Universe, winning the Congeniality award. In the early 2000s, she was one of the most famous models in Turkey.

Giving up her modelling career in favour of a career as a singer in 2006, she released her debut album, Çok Yalnızım, with the Turkish record company Seyhan Müzik. It received some radio airplay and was compared with the likes of Burcu Güneş and Emel Müftüoğlu.

She released her second album, Kukla, this time with another record company, Üçüncügöz Müzik, in 2008. This was met with more success than her previous album, and the first single from that album, also called "Kukla" reached the 10th position on the Turkish Billboard charts.

She hosted the Turkish versions of Wipeout, Fear Factor, Deal or No Deal (Var mısın? Yok musun?) and Big Brother Türkiye.

Discography

Albums
Çok Yalnızım (I'm so lonely) (2006, Ozyurt Müzik)
Kukla (Puppet) (2008, Erol Köse Prodüksiyon)

Singles

References

External links
Asuman Krause on Last.fm
Asuman Krause on Spotify

1976 births
Living people
Miss Universe 1998 contestants
Turkish female models
Turkish people of German descent
Turkish people of Circassian descent
German people of Turkish descent
21st-century Turkish singers
21st-century Turkish women singers